A metropolitan area is generally defined as consisting of an urban area, conurbation or agglomeration, together with the surrounding area to which it is closely economically and socially integrated through commuting.

The European Union's ESPON project defined a harmonised series of metropolitan areas across Europe, made up of two components: Morphological Urban Areas (MUAs), which are similar to urban areas that form the densely populated urban cores of metropolitan areas, and Functional Urban Areas (FUAs), which form the labour basin surrounding Morphological Urban Areas.

Morphological Urban Areas were calculated by combining contiguous local administrative units with population densities greater than 650 inhabitants per square kilometre, with Functional Urban Areas then being calculated by combining surrounding local administrative units where 10% or more of the workforce works within the core Morphological Urban Area.

According to the harmonised European definition, there were eighteen metropolitan areas in the United Kingdom with populations of more than 500,000 at the time of the 2001 census.

This article lists the UK metropolitan areas defined by ESPON, which excluded combined conurbations such as the Liverpool-Manchester megalopolis, which (in 2001) had a combined population of 5.6 million. It also excluded city regions such as those formed in Greater Manchester, Leeds, Liverpool and Sheffield, which are typically areas covered by a combined authority.

Metropolitan areas in the UK 

In 2001, there were 46 metropolitan areas in the United Kingdom with a populations in the range 150,000 to 25 million inhabitants, according to the ESPON project, with the following population distribution:

Summary

Source

List by population (2001 data)
Source

List by region (2001 data)

See also 
 List of metropolitan economies in the United Kingdom
 Core Cities Group
 Combined authority
 List of towns and cities in England by population
 List of urban areas in the United Kingdom
 Metropolitan and non-metropolitan counties of England
 Travel to work area
 List of metropolitan areas in Europe by population
 List of metropolitan areas by population for the world
 Larger urban zone

References 

United Kingdom

 
Metropolitan areas
United Kingdom lists by population